At least two ships of the Imperial Russian, Soviet or Russian Navy have been named Vladimir Monomakh  after Vladimir II Monomakh.

  - Armoured cruiser launched in 1882 and sunk at the Battle of Tsushima in 1905.
  - a Borei-class submarine launched in 2012.

Russian Navy ship names